James Evans "Grasshopper Jim" Whitney (November 10, 1857 – May 21, 1891) was an American professional baseball player.  He was a right-handed pitcher over parts of ten seasons (1881–1890) with the Boston Red Caps/Beaneaters, Kansas City Cowboys, Washington Nationals, Indianapolis Hoosiers and Philadelphia Athletics (AA).  He was the National League strikeout champion in 1883 with the Boston Beaneaters.

Early life
Whitney was born in Conklin, New York, and he had a brother named Charlie with whom he played baseball. When the brothers played on the same teams, each could serve as a pitcher or a catcher, so one sibling was often pitching to the other. Charlie Whitney played independent professional baseball.

Career
Playing with the semi-pro Binghamton Crickets before minor league stints in Oswego, New York, Omaha, and San Francisco, Whitney debuted in the major leagues for Harry Wright's 1881 Boston Red Caps, and he worked hard that season, throwing 57 complete games and pitching 552 innings that year. A Boston journalist called Whitney "the swiftest pitcher in the league". Some accounts describe that Whitney was disliked by umpires, who said that he would spend much of the game complaining about calls that did not go in his favor.

Whitney had unique pitching mechanics. In 19th century baseball, the ball was delivered from a rectangular pitcher's box six feet in length. Pitchers would sometimes hop forward within the box before releasing the ball, and some would leap into the air during the process. Batters made fun of Whitney when he did this, giving him the nickname "Grasshopper Jim", but Whitney's pitching was effective for several years.

For his career, he compiled a 191–204 record in 413 appearances, with a 2.97 ERA and 1,571 strikeouts. During his five seasons with the Boston franchise (now the Atlanta Braves), he ranks 4th in franchise history in ERA (2.49), 3rd in WHIP (1.082), 9th in innings pitched (2263), 8th in strikeouts (1157), 9th in games started (254), 4th in complete games (242), 1st in strikeout to walk ratio (5.03), 7th in losses (121), and 2nd in wild pitches (162).

Death
Whitney died in 1891 in Binghamton, New York, at the home of his father, Rufus Whitney. Tuberculosis was the cause of death.

See also

 List of Major League Baseball annual saves leaders
 List of Major League Baseball annual strikeout leaders
 List of Major League Baseball annual wins leaders

References

External links

1857 births
1891 deaths
Major League Baseball pitchers
National League wins champions
National League strikeout champions
Boston Red Caps players
Boston Beaneaters players
Kansas City Cowboys (NL) players
Indianapolis Hoosiers (NL) players
Philadelphia Athletics (AA) players
Binghamton Crickets (1870s) players
Omaha Green Stockings players
San Francisco Athletics players
San Francisco Knickerbockers players
Buffalo Bisons (minor league) players
Baseball players from New York (state)
People from Broome County, New York
19th-century deaths from tuberculosis
Tuberculosis deaths in New York (state)